= Amy Livingstone =

Medieval European historian (born 1961)

Amy Livingstone (born 1961) is a medieval European historian. Her research primarily focuses on gender studies, with a concentration on aristocratic women in the Loire Valley.

== Education ==
Amy Livingstone completed her Bachelor of Arts and master's degrees in history at Michigan State University. She furthered her education at the same institution, earning a Ph.D. in Medieval History in 1992. She presented her dissertation on the structure of noble families in Blois and Chartres from the late tenth century to the mid-twelfth century.

== Career ==
Her career in higher education continued after her doctorate, spanning five institutions: Michigan State University (1983–1988), Maryville College (1992–1999), Wittenberg University—where she worked for 19 years in 12 different positions, including Dean of the Honors College—and Ball State University, and as Head of the Lincoln School of History and Heritage and a professor of history, where she continues to work today. Throughout her career, Livingstone has hosted at least 11 conferences, presented at 22, and delivered 14 invited lectures. Additionally, she has reviewed and edited numerous published articles, manuscripts, journals, and essays. As of 2020, Livingstone has published seven essays and articles, co-edited two volumes, and written three monographs. Her contributions to higher education continue as she teaches and works on new projects.

== Honors ==
At Wittenberg University, Livingstone received research grants for her work and presentations every year for all 19 years she worked there, this totaled to $34,000. In 2017, she was honored with the Medieval Academy of America/CARA Award for Excellence in Teaching. In 1998, her article: “Aristocratic Women in the Chartrain” was selected “December’s Article of the Month” for the Medieval Feminist Website due to “the importance of the thesis, the skill with which it was written, and its appeal to undergraduates.”

Livingstone's research achievements include a Life Membership at Clare Hall, University of Cambridge, awarded in Fall 2019, and a Visiting Fellowship at Clare Hall in Spring 2019. In 2017, she was selected as an alternate for a fellowship at the Institut d'Études Avancées de Nantes, France. Additionally, in 1995, Livingstone received a Mellon Faculty–Student Research Grant of $5,000 to develop a database for medieval charter data, further advancing her scholarly contributions to the field.

== Research ==
=== Books ===
Livingstone published her first monograph Out of Love for My Kin: Aristocratic Family Life in the Lands of the Loire, 1000–1200 in 2010. In this book Livingstone investigates the role of family ties and examines family dynamics in aristocratic families around the eleventh and twelfth century. Through her research she determines the belief that medieval people had duty to do right by their kin played a central role in medieval politics, disputing ideas that self interest was most often the top priority in medieval Europe. Through this research she further argues for the agency of women and the rather modern and western family dynamics medieval aristocrats had.

Her second monograph Medieval Lives c. 1000–1292: The world of the Beaugency Family came in 2018. In this book Livingstone investigates one singular family, the Beaugencys. Her research on this family is significant due to its contributions to scholarly understanding of the medieval lives of "normal" people. The Beaugancys were upper class nobles but never kings or lords, meaning they represent a much larger population of people compared to those elites that so much research has already been done on.

=== Articles and essays ===
In her article “Kith and Kin: Kinship and Family Structure of the Nobility of Eleventh- and Twelfth-Century Blois-Chartres” Livingstone explores how family ties played a central role in structuring both social relationships and political power, her analysis is supported by both her research in the Loire Valley and her book Out of Love For My Kin. Her examination of different families' methods of transferring power highlights the nuances of feudal loyalties and social dynamics that were integrated in familial and social bonds. Livingstone sheds light on how power was organized and transferred in the medieval period, she determines “Kinship configuration varied within families and between generations and was subject to specific circumstances, stimuli, and developments.”

Her article “Pious Women in a ‘Den of Scorpions’ The Piety and Patronage of the Eleventh-Century Countesses of Brittany” is the narrative of the Countesses of Brittany, aristocratic women whose husbands counted on them to forge political relationships to aid them in their control of Brittany. Livingstone introduces the benefits of being an aristocratic woman and how they used their relationships to navigate politics and power. When Lords found themselves in conflict with the Church they would recruit their wives or female relatives to vouch for them and mend their religious relationships. Since aristocratic women spent their time practicing piety the Churches saw them as respectable figures and would listen to them more than their sometimes greedy husbands.

In Livingstones chapter “Revealing the Extraordinary: The Lives of Unremarkable Men in the Age of Louis VII.” In Louis VII and His World, edited by Michael L. Bardot and Laurence W. Marvin, Livingstone argues that “Much can be learned from these ordinary lives, for the social and economic transformations that occurred during the reign of Louis VII were pivotal to the development of all of France.” Through examination of the brothers' wills and testaments Livingstone can hypothesize how the ordinary lives of members of the community were affected by the reign of Louis VII, finding that his reign was most likely within a politically stable climate. By focusing on these two men, Livingstone highlights the complexities of familial relations and how they can change through different political contexts.

These featured works are not the bulk of her research, she has further work including at least 15 more published articles and essays. additionally, she is working on a third monograph Shrewd in Counsel, Powerful in Eloquence: Countess Ermengarde of Brittany (c. 1070–1147).
